Le Matin is a daily newspaper published in Haiti. It was founded on 1 April 1907, by Clément Magloire.

After a two-year absence, the newspaper returned in circulation at the beginning of April 2004 under its current ownership.

See also
 List of newspapers in Haiti
 Media of Haiti

External links
Le Matin
Historical issues of Le Matin in the Digital Library of the Caribbean

French-language newspapers published in North America
Newspapers published in Haiti
Publications established in 1907
1907 establishments in Haiti